|}

The Phoenix Stakes is a Group 1 flat horse race in Ireland open to two-year-old thoroughbred colts and fillies. It is run at the Curragh over a distance of 6 furlongs (1,207 metres), and it is scheduled to take place each year in August.

History
The event was established in 1902, and it was originally held at Phoenix Park. It used to be called the Phoenix Plate, and was informally known as "the 1500". It was initially contested over 5 furlongs.

The race was renamed the Phoenix Stakes in 1956. It was given Group 2 status in 1971, and promoted to Group 1 level in 1979.

The Phoenix Stakes was staged at Leopardstown in 1982. It returned to Phoenix Park with a new distance of 6 furlongs in 1983.

Phoenix Park Racecourse closed in 1990, and the event switched to Leopardstown in 1991. It moved to the Curragh in 2002.

Records
Leading jockey since 1950 (5 wins):
 Michael Kinane – King Persian (1983), Fasliyev (1999), Minardi (2000), Johannesburg (2001), One Cool Cat (2003)

Leading trainer since 1950 (17 wins):
 Aidan O'Brien – Lavery (1998), Fasliyev (1999), Minardi (2000), Johannesburg (2001), Spartacus (2002), One Cool Cat (2003), George Washington (2005), Holy Roman Emperor (2006), Mastercraftsman (2008), Alfred Nobel (2009), Zoffany (2010), Pedro the Great (2012), Dick Whittington (2014), Air Force Blue (2015), Caravaggio (2016), Sioux Nation (2017), Little Big Bear (2022)

Leading owner since 1981 (19 wins): (includes part ownership)
 Sue Magnier – Lavery (1998), Fasliyev (1999), Minardi (2000), Johannesburg (2001), Spartacus (2002), One Cool Cat (2003), Damson (2004), George Washington (2005), Holy Roman Emperor (2006), Mastercraftsman (2008), Alfred Nobel (2009), Zoffany (2010), Pedro the Great (2012), Sudirman (2013), Dick Whittington (2014), Air Force Blue (2015), Caravaggio (2016), Sioux Nation (2017), Little Big Bear (2022)

Winners since 1979

Earlier winners

 1902: Bushey Belle
 1903: Cape Solitaire
 1904: Abelard
 1905: Athleague
 1906: Lalla Rookh
 1907: Americus Girl
 1908: Glenesky
 1909: Lady Edgar
 1910: Clonbern
 1911: Far and Wide
 1912: Happy Fanny
 1913: Courier Belle
 1914: St Cuimin
 1915: Vera Cruz
 1916: The Banshee
 1917: Bonnie Dance
 1918: Gilded Vanity
 1919: Blue Dun
 1920: Double Tip
 1921: Bridgemount
 1922: Rabona
 1923: Dawson City
 1924: Pons Asinorum
 1925: Allets
 1926: Archway
 1927: Athford
 1928: Trigo
 1929: Confetti
 1930: Galapas
 1931: The Greek
 1932: Cedarhurst
 1933: His Reverence
 1934: Smokeless
 1935: Dancing Comet
 1936: Phideas
 1937: Knight's Caprice
 1938: New Comet
 1939: Eyrefield
 1940: Enchantress
 1941: Fair Crystal
 1942: The Phoenix
 1943: Arctic Sun
 1944: Lady's View
 1945: Momentum
 1946: Lady Kells
 1947: The Web
 1948: Ballywillwill
 1949: Abadan
 1950: Gold Cup
 1951: Windy City
 1952: Royal Duchy
 1953: Sixpence
 1954: My Beau
 1955: Sarissa
 1956: Refined
 1957: Vestogan
 1958: Getaway
 1959: Gigi
 1960: Kathy Too
 1961: Prince Poppa
 1962: Irish Chorus
 1963: Right Strath
 1964: Adriatic Star
 1965: Current Coin *
 1966: Jadeite
 1967: Fatima's Gift
 1968: Lord John
 1969: Pianissimo
 1970: Areola
 1971: Celtic Twilight
 1972: Marble Arch
 1973: Noble Mark
 1974: Lady Seymour
 1975: National Wish
 1976: Cloonlara
 1977: Perla
 1978: Kilijaro

* Red Taffy finished first in 1965, but he was disqualified.

See also
 Horse racing in Ireland
 List of Irish flat horse races
 Recurring sporting events established in 1902 – this race is included under its original title, Phoenix Plate.

References
 Racing Post:

 galopp-sieger.de – Phoenix Stakes.
 ifhaonline.org – International Federation of Horseracing Authorities – Phoenix Stakes (2019).
 irishracinggreats.com – Phoenix Stakes (Group 1).
 pedigreequery.com – Phoenix Stakes.
 tbheritage.com – Phoenix Stakes.

Flat races in Ireland
Curragh Racecourse
Flat horse races for two-year-olds
1902 establishments in Ireland
Recurring sporting events established in 1902